Cardiff South East was a parliamentary constituency in Cardiff, Wales.  It returned one Member of Parliament to the House of Commons of the Parliament of the United Kingdom.

The constituency was created for the 1950 general election, and abolished for the 1983 general election. Its only MP was Labour's James Callaghan, who served as Prime Minister of the United Kingdom from 1976 to 1979, while still serving as the seat's MP. Its present-day equivalent is Cardiff South and Penarth.

Boundaries 
1950–1974: The County Borough of Cardiff wards of Adamsdown, Roath, South, and Splott, and the Urban District of Penarth.

1974–1983: The County Borough of Cardiff wards of Adamsdown, Grangetown, Roath, Rumney, South, and Splott.

Members of Parliament

Election results

Elections in the 1950s

Elections in the 1960s

Elections in the 1970s

Note: The official Liberal candidate for Cardiff South East in 1979, Christopher Bailey, deliberately failed to submit his nomination papers in time and advised Liberal voters to vote Conservative. He was subsequently expelled from the Liberal Party.

This election was remembered for when Pat Arrowsmith heckled Callaghan throughout the election declaration. During the customary victory speech, Callaghan continued to be interrupted throughout and Callaghan remarked it was the first time he had ‘conducted a duet’ whilst giving a victory speech. When Arrowsmith refused to desist, Callaghan and the other candidates left the stage. Arrowsmith (who had been arrested in Cardiff the day before the election) made a short statement about Northern Ireland. These scenes were broadcast live on BBC Election 79.

References 

Politics of Cardiff
History of Glamorgan
Historic parliamentary constituencies in South Wales
Constituencies of the Parliament of the United Kingdom established in 1950
Constituencies of the Parliament of the United Kingdom disestablished in 1983
Constituencies of the Parliament of the United Kingdom represented by a sitting Prime Minister